There are several educational institutions that are called the College of Physicians and Surgeons:

Canada
College of Physicians and Surgeons of Alberta
College of Physicians and Surgeons of British Columbia
College of Physicians and Surgeons of Manitoba
College of Physicians and Surgeons of Ontario
College of Physicians and Surgeons of Saskatchewan

India
College of Physicians & Surgeons of Mumbai, India

Pakistan
College of Physicians and Surgeons Pakistan

United States
College of Physicians and Surgeons (San Francisco), later became the Arthur A. Dugoni School of Dentistry, California
College of Physicians and Surgeons (Chicago), later became the University of Illinois College of Medicine, Illinois
College of Physicians and Surgeons (Baltimore), merged with the University of Maryland School of Medicine, Maryland
Columbia University Vagelos College of Physicians and Surgeons, New York

See also
College of Physicians
Royal College of Physicians and Surgeons (disambiguation)